Miguel Joyal is a Canadian-born Métis artist and sculptor.

Joyal created the Louis Riel sculpture located at the Manitoba Legislative Building. Completed in 1996, the sculpture was commissioned by the Manitoba Metis Federation, and replaced an existing statue of Riel from 1971, which had garnered controversy.

Joyal was commissioned to contribute a sculpture to the University of Manitoba campus. Unveiled in 2011, the sculpture represents Louis Riel as a scholar learning the "laws of the land".

In January 2018, Joyal completed a statue of Saint Boniface activist Georges Forest for placement in Winnipeg's Provencher Park. The statue was initially rejected by the committee overseeing the project.

Joyal has also created sculptures from snow and styrofoam for Winnipeg's annual winter Festival du Voyageur, as well as wood chieftains and Madonnas, stone figurines and eagle heads, and a nearly life-size airplane.

References 

Canadian sculptors
Canadian male sculptors
Living people
Year of birth missing (living people)
Artists from Winnipeg